"Queen B." is the first single released from the album "V" Is for Vagina by Puscifer. It peaked at number 26 on the Billboard Hot Modern Rock Tracks chart in late 2007. The music video version of the song is around 20 seconds longer than the album version of the song.

Track listing
"Queen B." – 3:54
"DoZo" – 4:00

Music video
Directed by Meats Meier, the video is of fully CGI 'Maynards' and two 'Puscifers' playing a game of chess, as two women sit close by and drink wine, a possible reference to Maynard James Keenan's wine production. The game features the Scholar's mate.

Use in other media
The song was featured at the opening of Warehouse 13 episode "Implosion", episode 7 of season 1.

References

2007 singles
Puscifer songs
2007 songs
Songs written by Maynard James Keenan
Songs written by Tim Alexander